Mount Loolmalasin (sometimes spelled "Loolmalassin") is a mountain located in the Ngorongoro District of the Arusha Region, Tanzania. It is, after Mount Kilimanjaro and Mount Meru, the third-highest mountain in Tanzania if Kilimanjaro's three peaks are considered to be one mountain.
Mount Loolmalasin is the second tallest mountain in Arusha Region and the tallest point in Ngorongoro District. The mountain also is the source of Simiyu River, which flows west to Lake Victoria in Simiyu Region.

See also
 List of Ultras of Africa

References

Loolmalasin
Geography of Arusha Region
Ngorongoro District